Maria Rosario Rivera Silayan-Bailon (July 8, 1959 – April 23, 2006), also known as Chat Silayan, was a Filipino beauty queen and actress. She won the Binibining Pilipinas Universe 1980 crown and became the third runner-up at Miss Universe 1980. A year after her stint in Miss Universe, her acting career began and she became one of the most popular and acclaimed actresses in the Philippines. She was the daughter of theatre and movie actor Vic Silayan and the aunt of Victor Silayan. She retired from acting in 2003 and became active in church activities and worked as a part-time announcer and host for The 700 Club Asia.

Career
In May 1989, Silayan co-hosted the 37th FAMAS Awards with Roy Alvarez.

Filmography

Film

Television
Noli Me Tángere - Sinang
Esperanza (1997–1999) - Ester
The 700 Club Asia - TV host
Student Canteen
Swerte sa Siete
Maalaala Mo Kaya

References

1959 births
2006 deaths
Binibining Pilipinas winners
Burials at the Manila Memorial Park – Sucat
Deaths from colorectal cancer
Deaths from cancer in the Philippines
Filipino Christians
Filipino evangelicals
Filipino film actresses
Filipino Pentecostals
Filipino television actresses
Filipino television evangelists
Filipino television personalities
Miss Universe 1980 contestants